Alazne is a Basque feminine given name, meaning "mirror". The name was proposed by Sabino Arana in his 1910 list of Basque saints names as an equivalent to Milagros. The name day is on July 21. In the United States, it was ranked #6005 by popularity in 2020.

Notable people with the name include: 

Alazne Ameztoy, Spanish composer
Alazne Etxebarria, Spanish actress
Alazne Furundarena, Spanish sprinter
Alazne Gómez, Basque footballer
Alazne Urizar, Venezuelan golfist

Alazne Ortega, Altered Carbon (TV series) fictional character

References

Basque feminine given names